Molecular machines are a class of molecules typically described as an assembly of a discrete number of molecular components intended to produce mechanical movements in response to specific stimuli, mimicking macromolecular devices such as switches and motors. Naturally occurring or biological molecular machines such as kinesins and ribosomes (often in the form of multi-protein complexes) are responsible for vital living processes such as DNA replication and ATP synthesis. For the last several decades, scientists have attempted, with varying degrees of success, to miniaturize machines found in the macroscopic world. The first example of an artificial molecular machine (AMM) was reported in 1994, featuring a rotaxane with a ring and two different possible binding sites. In 2016 the Nobel Prize in Chemistry was awarded to Jean-Pierre Sauvage, Sir J. Fraser Stoddart, and Bernard L. Feringa for the design and synthesis of molecular machines.

AMMs have diversified rapidly over the past few decades and their design principles, properties, and characterization methods have been outlined better. A major starting point for the design of AMMs is to exploit the existing modes of motion in molecules, such as rotation about single bonds or cis-trans isomerization. Different AMMs are produced by introducing various functionalities, such as the introduction of bistability to create switches. A broad range of AMMs has been designed, featuring different properties and applications; some of these include molecular motors, switches, and logic gates. A wide range of applications have been demonstrated for AMMs, including those integrated into polymeric, liquid crystal, and crystalline systems for varied functions (such as materials research, homogenous catalysis and surface chemistry).

Terminology
Several definitions describe a "molecular machine" as a class of molecules typically described as an assembly of a discrete number of molecular components intended to produce mechanical movements in response to specific stimuli. The expression is often more generally applied to molecules that simply mimic functions that occur at the macroscopic level. A few prime requirements for a molecule to be considered a "molecular machine" are: the presence of moving parts, the ability to consume energy, and the ability to perform a task. Molecular machines differ from other stimuli-responsive compounds that can produce motion (such as cis-trans isomers) in their relatively larger amplitude of movement (potentially due to chemical reactions) and the presence of a clear external stimulus to regulate the movements (as compared to random thermal motion).

This definition generally applies to synthetic molecular machines, which have historically gained inspiration from the naturally occurring biological molecular machines (also referred to as "nanomachines"). Biological machines are considered to be nanoscale devices (such as molecular proteins) in a living system that convert various forms of energy to mechanical work in order to drive crucial biological processes such as intracellular transport, muscle contractions, ATP generation and cell division.

History

Biological molecular machines have been known and studied for years given their vital role in sustaining life, and have served as inspiration for synthetically designed systems with similar useful functionality. The advent of conformational analysis, or the study of conformers to analyze complex chemical structures, in the 1950s gave rise to the idea of understanding and controlling relative motion within molecular components for further applications. This led to the design of "proto-molecular machines" featuring conformational changes such as cog-wheeling of the aromatic rings in triptycenes. By 1980, scientists could achieve desired conformations using external stimuli and utilize this for different applications. A major example is the design of a photoresponsive crown ether containing an azobenzene unit, which could switch between cis and trans isomers on exposure to light and hence tune the cation-binding properties of the ether. In his seminal 1959 lecture There's Plenty of Room at the Bottom, Richard Feynman alluded to the idea and applications of molecular devices designed artificially by manipulating matter at the atomic level. This was further substantiated by Eric Drexler during the 1970s, who developed ideas based on molecular nanotechnology such as nanoscale "assemblers", though their feasibility was disputed.

Though these events served as inspiration for the field, the actual breakthrough in practical approaches to synthesize artificial molecular machines (AMMs) took place in 1991 with the invention of a "molecular shuttle" by Sir Fraser Stoddart. Building upon the assembly of mechanically linked molecules such as catenanes and rotaxanes as developed by Jean-Pierre Sauvage in the early 1980s, this shuttle features a rotaxane with a ring that can move across an "axle" between two ends or possible binding sites (hydroquinone units). This design realized the well-defined motion of a molecular unit across the length of the molecule for the first time. In 1994, an improved design allowed control over the motion of the ring by pH variation or electrochemical methods, making it the first example of an AMM. Here the two binding sites are a benzidine and a biphenol unit; the cationic ring typically prefers staying over the benzidine ring, but moves over to the biphenol group when the benzidine gets protonated at low pH or if it gets electrochemically oxidized. In 1998, a study could capture the rotary motion of a decacyclene molecule on a copper-base metallic surface using a scanning tunneling microscope. Over the following decade, a broad variety of AMMs responding to various stimuli were invented for different applications. In 2016, the Nobel Prize in Chemistry was awarded to Sauvage, Stoddart, and Bernard L. Feringa for the design and synthesis of molecular machines.

Artificial molecular machines

Over the past few decades, AMMs have diversified rapidly and their design principles, properties, and characterization methods have been outlined more clearly. A major starting point for the design of AMMs is to exploit the existing modes of motion in molecules. For instance, single bonds can be visualized as axes of rotation, as can be metallocene complexes. Bending or V-like shapes can be achieved by incorporating double bonds, that can undergo cis-trans isomerization in response to certain stimuli (typically irradiation with a suitable wavelength), as seen in numerous designs consisting of stilbene and azobenzene units. Similarly, ring-opening and -closing reactions such as those seen for spiropyran and diarylethene can also produce curved shapes. Another common mode of movement is the circumrotation of rings relative to one another as observed in mechanically interlocked molecules (primarily catenanes). While this type of rotation can not be accessed beyond the molecule itself (because the rings are confined within one another), rotaxanes can overcome this as the rings can undergo translational movements along a dumbbell-like axis. Another line of AMMs consists of biomolecules such as DNA and proteins as part of their design, making use of phenomena like protein folding and unfolding.

AMM designs have diversified significantly since the early days of the field. A major route is the introduction of bistability to produce molecular switches, featuring two distinct configurations for the molecule to convert between. This has been perceived as a step forward from the original molecular shuttle which consisted of two identical sites for the ring to move between without any preference, in a manner analogous to the ring flip in an unsubstituted cyclohexane. If these two sites are different from each other in terms of features like electron density, this can give rise to weak or strong recognition sites as in biological systems — such AMMs have found applications in catalysis and drug delivery. This switching behavior has been further optimized to acquire useful work that gets lost when a typical switch returns to its original state. 
Inspired by the use of kinetic control to produce work in natural processes, molecular motors are designed to have a continuous energy influx to keep them away from equilibrium to deliver work.

Various energy sources are employed to drive molecular machines today, but this was not the case during the early years of AMM development. Though the movements in AMMs were regulated relative to the random thermal motion generally seen in molecules, they could not be controlled or manipulated as desired. This led to the addition of stimuli-responsive moieties in AMM design, so that externally applied non-thermal sources of energy could drive molecular motion and hence allow control over the properties. Chemical energy (or "chemical fuels") was an attractive option at the beginning, given the broad array of reversible chemical reactions (heavily based on acid-base chemistry) to switch molecules between different states. However, this comes with the issue of practically regulating the delivery of the chemical fuel and the removal of waste generated to maintain the efficiency of the machine as in biological systems. Though some AMMs have found ways to circumvent this, more recently waste-free reactions such based on electron transfers or isomerization have gained attention (such as redox-responsive viologens). Eventually, several different forms of energy (electric, magnetic, optical and so on) have become the primary energy sources used to power AMMs, even producing autonomous systems such as light-driven motors.

Types 
Various AMMs have been designed with a broad range of functions and applications, several of which have been tabulated below along with indicative images:

Biological molecular machines

The most complex macromolecular machines are found within cells, often in the form of multi-protein complexes. Important examples of biological machines include motor proteins such as myosin, which is responsible for muscle contraction, kinesin, which moves cargo inside cells away from the nucleus along microtubules, and dynein, which moves cargo inside cells towards the nucleus and produces the axonemal beating of motile cilia and flagella.  "[I]n effect, the [motile cilium] is a nanomachine composed of perhaps over 600 proteins in molecular complexes, many of which also function independently as nanomachines ... Flexible linkers allow the mobile protein domains connected by them to recruit their binding partners and induce long-range allostery via protein domain dynamics." Other biological machines are responsible for energy production, for example ATP synthase which harnesses energy from proton gradients across membranes to drive a turbine-like motion used to synthesise ATP, the energy currency of a cell. Still other machines are responsible for gene expression, including DNA polymerases for replicating DNA, RNA polymerases for producing mRNA, the spliceosome for removing introns, and the ribosome for synthesising proteins. These machines and their nanoscale dynamics are far more complex than any molecular machines that have yet been artificially constructed.

Biological machines have potential applications in nanomedicine.  For example, they could be used to identify and destroy cancer cells. Molecular nanotechnology is a speculative subfield of nanotechnology regarding the possibility of engineering molecular assemblers, biological machines which could re-order matter at a molecular or atomic scale. Nanomedicine would make use of these nanorobots, introduced into the body, to repair or detect damages and infections, but these are considered to be far beyond current capabilities.

Research and applications
The construction of more complex molecular machines is an active area of theoretical and experimental research.  Though a diverse variety of AMMs are known today, experimental studies of these molecules are inhibited by the lack of methods to construct these molecules. In this context, theoretical modeling has emerged as a pivotal tool to understand the self-assembly or -disassembly processes in these systems.

A wide range of applications have been demonstrated for AMMs, including those integrated into polymeric, liquid crystal, and crystalline systems for varied functions. Homogenous catalysis is a prominent example, especially in areas like asymmetric synthesis, utilizing noncovalent interactions and biomimetic allosteric catalysis. AMMs have been pivotal in the design of several stimuli-responsive smart materials, such as 2D and 3D self-assembled materials and nanoparticle-based systems, for versatile applications ranging from 3D printing to drug delivery. 

AMMs are gradually moving from the conventional solution-phase chemistry to surfaces and interfaces. For instance, AMM-immobilized surfaces (AMMISs) are a novel class of functional materials consisting of AMMs attached to inorganic surfaces forming features like self-assembled monolayers; this gives rise to tunable properties such as fluorescence, aggregation and drug-release activity. 

Most of these applications remain at the proof-of-concept level, and need major modifications to be adapted to the industrial scale. Challenges in streamlining macroscale applications include autonomous operation, the complexity of the machines, stability in the synthesis of the machines and the working conditions.

See also

 Nanobot
Technorganic

References 

Nanotechnology
Supramolecular chemistry
Molecular machines
Nanomachines